The 1953 Texas Longhorns baseball team represented the University of Texas at Austin in the 1953 NCAA baseball season. The Longhorns played their home games at Clark Field. The team was coached by Bibb Falk in his 11th season at Texas.

The Longhorns reached the College World Series final, but were eliminated by Michigan.

Personnel

Roster

Coaches

Schedule

! style="background:#CC5500;color:white;"| Regular Season
|- valign="top" 

|- align="center" bgcolor="ccffcc"
| March 17 || at Baylor (Houston) || Houston, TX || W 10–5 || 1–0 || 
|- align="center" bgcolor="ccffcc"
| March 21 || Baylor (Houston) || Houston, TX || W 25–7 || 2–0 || 
|- align="center" bgcolor="ccffcc"
| March 23 ||  || Clark Field • Austin, TX || W 8–6 || 3–0 || 
|- align="center" bgcolor="ccffcc"
| March 24 || Minnesota || Clark Field • Austin, TX || W 7–6 || 4–0 || 
|- align="center" bgcolor="ccffcc"
| March 26 ||  || Clark Field • Austin, TX || W 9–0 || 5–0 || 1–0
|- align="center" bgcolor="ffffbb"
| March 31 || at  || Houston, TX || T 2–215 || 5–0–1 || 1–0–1
|-

|- align="center" bgcolor="ccffcc"
| April 2 ||  || Clark Field • Austin, TX || W 6–5 || 6–0–1  || 
|- align="center" bgcolor="ffbbb"
| April 7 ||  || Clark Field • Austin, TX || L 1–3 || 6–1–1 || 
|- align="center" bgcolor="ccffcc"
| April 8 || Oklahoma || Clark Field • Austin, TX || W 18–8 || 7–1–1 || 
|- align="center" bgcolor="ccffcc"
| April 10 || at  || Waco, TX || W 6–5 || 8–1–1 || 2–0–1
|- align="center" bgcolor="ffbbb"
| April 11 || at Baylor || Waco, TX || L 9–10 || 8–2–1 || 2–1–1
|- align="center" bgcolor="ffbbb"
| April 17 ||  || Clark Field • Austin, TX || L 3–12 || 8–3–1 || 2–2–1
|- align="center" bgcolor="ccffcc"
| April 18 || SMU || Clark Field • Austin, TX || W 10–912 || 9–3–1 || 3–2–1
|- align="center" bgcolor="ccffcc"
| April 21 ||  || Clark Field • Austin, TX || W 12–5 || 10–3–1 || 4–2–1
|- align="center" bgcolor="ccffcc"
| April 25 || Baylor || Clark Field • Austin, TX || W 14–11 || 11–3–1 || 5–2–1
|-

|- align="center" bgcolor="ccffcc"
| May 1 || at  || Fort Worth, TX || W 12–5 || 12–3–1 || 6–2–1
|- align="center" bgcolor="ccffcc"
| May 2 || at TCU || Fort Worth, TX || W 7–4 || 13–3–1 || 7–2–1
|- align="center" bgcolor="ccffcc"
| May 4 || at  || Dallas, TX || W 8–5 || 14–3–1 || 8–2–1
|- align="center" bgcolor="ccffcc"
| May 7 ||  || Clark Field • Austin, TX || W 7–2 || 15–3–1 || 9–2–1
|- align="center" bgcolor="ccffcc"
| May 7 || Rice || Clark Field • Austin, TX || W 12–2 || 16–3–1 || 10–2–1
|- align="center" bgcolor="ffbbb"
| May 8 || Rice || Clark Field • Austin, TX || L 2–4 || 16–4–1 || 10–3–1
|- align="center" bgcolor="ccffcc"
| May 18 || at  || Kyle Baseball Field • College Station, TX || W 1–0 || 17–4–1 || 11–3–1
|- align="center" bgcolor="ccffcc"
| May 18 || at Texas A&M || Kyle Baseball Field • College Station, TX || W 4–1 || 18–4–1 || 12–3–1
|- align="center" bgcolor="ccffcc"
| May 29 || at Seguin White Sox || Seguin, TX || W 6–3 || exh. || 
|-

|-
! style="background:#CC5500;color:white;"| Post-Season
|-

|- align="center" bgcolor="ccffcc"
| June 3 || at  || Tucson, AZ || W 7–6 || 19–4–1 || 1–0
|- align="center" bgcolor="ffbbb"
| June 4 || at Arizona || Tucson, AZ || L 3–4 || 19–5–1 || 1–1
|- align="center" bgcolor="ccffcc"
| June 5 || at Arizona || Tucson, AZ || W 5–3 || 20–5–1 || 2–1
|-

|- align="center" bgcolor="ccffcc"
| June 11 || Duke || Johnny Rosenblatt Stadium • Omaha, NE || W 2–1 || 21–5–1 || 1–0
|- align="center" bgcolor="ccffcc"
| June 12 || Lafayette || Johnny Rosenblatt Stadium • Omaha, NE || W 5–3 || 22–5–1 || 2–0
|- align="center" bgcolor="ffbbb"
| June 13 || Michigan || Johnny Rosenblatt Stadium • Omaha, NE || L 5–12 || 22–6–1 || 2–1
|- align="center" bgcolor="ccffcc"
| June 14 || Michigan || Johnny Rosenblatt Stadium • Omaha, NE || W 6–4 || 23–6–1 || 3–1
|- align="center" bgcolor="ccffcc"
| June 15 || Lafayette || Johnny Rosenblatt Stadium • Omaha, NE || W 13–3 || 24–6–1 || 4–1
|- align="center" bgcolor="ffbbb"
| June 16 || Michigan || Johnny Rosenblatt Stadium • Omaha, NE || L 5–7 || 24–7–1 || 4–2
|-

References

Texas Longhorns baseball seasons
Texas Longhorns
College World Series seasons
Texas Longhorns